Nikita Nikolayevich Moiseyev (Russian: Никита Николаевич Моисеев) (23 August 1917 – 29 February 2000) was a prominent Soviet and Russian mathematician, full member of the Soviet and Russian Academies of Sciences and of the International Academy of Science, Munich.

Biography
Moiseyev studied in Moscow State University, and received his doctor's degree from the Steklov Institute. He taught in Bauman Moscow State Technical University and Rostov State University after the war, and was appointed professor in Moscow Institute of Physics and Technology (1956) and became its dean in the department of applied mathematics. His fields of study included applied mathematics, solid state dynamics in liquids, systems analysis, control of the artificial space objects, dynamics of biosphere and its stability (including consequences of nuclear war — "nuclear winter"). Since 1956 till his death he also worked at the Dorodnicyn Computing Centre. He organized the Russian Section of
Green Cross International and became its first President. Nominating him for the 1994 Global 500 Roll of Honour UNEP stated: "He is a member of the Russian Academy of Sciences, whose spectrum of interests and activities brought him from computing military missile trajectories to mathematical modelling of the pernicious effects of a large scale nuclear war, to his current involvement in environmental activities aimed at protecting future generations."

External links 
Photo-Archive Nikita Moiseev
List of publications by N.N. Moiseev
UNEP Global 500 Roll of Honour/Laureates for Environmental Achievement
 N. N. Moiseev sci. works // Math-net.ru
 Nikita N. Moiseev. How Far It Is to Tomorrow. Reflection of an Eminent Russian Applied Mathematician. 1917-2000. / Preface by prof. Felix I. Ereshko. Birkhauser. Translated by Robert G. Burns and Iouldouz S. Ragimov, 2022. Toronto, ON, Canada.   392 p.

1917 births
2000 deaths
20th-century Russian mathematicians
Full Members of the USSR Academy of Sciences
Full Members of the Russian Academy of Sciences
Academicians of the VASKhNIL
Academic staff of the Moscow Institute of Physics and Technology
Soviet mathematicians
Moscow State University alumni